The 2002 Nevada gubernatorial election took place on November 5, 2002. Incumbent Republican Governor Kenny Guinn defeated Democratic nominee and Nevada Senator Joe Neal in a landslide to win a second term.

, this was the most recent Nevada gubernatorial election in which both major party candidates are now deceased.

Democratic primary

Candidates
Joe Neal, Nevada Senator and candidate in 1998
Barbara Scott, public accountant
Dan Meyer
Christopher J. Petrella, veteran

Results

Republican primary

Candidates
Kenny Guinn, incumbent Governor of Nevada
Shirley Cook, retired court reporter
Bruce Westcott, businessman
Bill Hiett, rancher
Stan Lusak, retired janitor and postal employee
James K. Prevot
Carlo Poliak, perennial candidate

Results

General election

Predictions

Polling

Results

Notes

References

2002
Nevada
Gubernatorial